The First Easter Rabbit is an animated Easter television special that premiered April 9, 1976 on NBC and later aired on CBS. Created by Rankin/Bass Productions, it tells the story of the Easter Bunny's origin. The special is loosely based on the 1922 children's book The Velveteen Rabbit by Margery Williams. Burl Ives narrated the special which also featured the Irving Berlin song "Easter Parade"; it marked Ives's return to a Rankin/Bass special for the first time since the company's 1964 stop motion television special Rudolph the Red-Nosed Reindeer twelve years prior.

Plot

Stuffy is a stuffed rabbit, given to a little girl named Glinda as a Christmas present. But one day, when she becomes sick after contracting scarlet fever, her old toys are thrown away to be burned in order to disinfect the playroom. Stuffy is rescued by a sprite named Calliope, who brings him to life and sends him to Easter Valley at the North Pole where he befriends Santa Claus and three other rabbits named Spats, Flops, and Whiskers to help him with the Easter traditions. However, an ice being named Zero wants to freeze the valley by stealing the Golden Easter Lily with the help of his reluctant partner, a sentient snowball named Bruce. In order to stop Zero, Stuffy must become the Easter Bunny, retrieve the Golden Lily, and save Easter Valley.

Cast
 Burl Ives as G.B.
 Robert Morse as Stuffy
 Stan Freberg as Flops
 Paul Frees as Santa Claus, Zero, Spats
 Joan Gardner as Elizabeth, Calliope
 Dina Lynn as Glinda
 Don Messick as Jonathan, Whiskers, Bruce the Snowball
 Christine Winter as Vocalist

Crew
 Producers/Directors - Jules Bass, Arthur Rankin, Jr.
 Writer - Julian P. Gardner
 Songs - There's That Rabbit, Easter Parade
 Music and Lyrics - Jules Bass, Irving Berlin, Maury Laws
 Sound - John Curcio, Don Hahn, Dave Iveland, Tom Clack
 Post Production Editing - Irwin Goldress
 Overseas Animation Production - Topcraft (uncredited)
 Animation - Toru Hara, Tsuguyuki Kubo
 Animation Directors - Kazuyuki Kobayashi, Hidemi Kubo (uncredited)
 Backgrounds - Minoru Nishida (uncredited)
 Key Animation - Yoshiko Sasaki, Tadakatsu Yoshida (uncredited)
 Design - Paul Coker, Jr.
 Music Arranger and Conductor - Maury Laws

Home media
The First Easter Rabbit was first released on VHS by ABC Video Enterprises and Golden Book Video in 1986. The second release, by Warner Home Video, to VHS occurred in 1993, and a remastered "Deluxe Edition" was issued on DVD in 2010.

References

External links
 

1976 in American television
1976 television specials
1970s American television specials
1970s animated television specials
1970s American animated films
1976 animated films
Easter television specials
Sentient toys in fiction
Topcraft
Films scored by Maury Laws
Television shows directed by Jules Bass
Television shows directed by Arthur Rankin Jr.
Rankin/Bass Productions television specials
Easter Bunny in television